Frank Lynch (born 1938) is an Irish Gaelic games administrator, Gaelic football manager and former player. His league and championship career with the Louth senior team lasted fourteen seasons from 1956 until 1970.

Born in Haggardstown, County Louth, Lynch was educated at St. Mary's College in Dundalk. At school he was a promising exponent of rugby union and captained the team before being selected to play for Leinster at youths level. Lynch later joined the Geraldines club with whom he won a county junior championship medal in 1966. 

After being excluded from the Louth minor because of his rugby exploits, Lynch subsequently joined the senior team and made his debut during the 1956–57 league. Over the following fourteen seasons Lynch had some success, culminating with the winning of a set of All-Ireland and Leinster medals in his debut season. He played his last game for Louth in June 1970.

As a member of the Leinster inter-provincial team on a number of occasions, Lynch won back-to-back Railway Cup medals in 1961 and 1962.

In retirement from playing, Lynch remained involved as an administrator and coach. He served as chairman of the Louth County Board and had two spells as manager of the Louth senior team.

Honours
Geraldines
Louth Junior Football Championship (1): 1966

Louth
All-Ireland Senior Football Championship (1): 1957
Leinster Senior Football Championship (1): 1957

Leinster
Railway Cup (2): 1961, 1962

References

1938 births
Living people
Chairmen of county boards of the Gaelic Athletic Association
Gaelic footballers who switched code
Gaelic football managers
Irish accountants
Louth County Board administrators
Louth inter-county Gaelic footballers
Rugby union players from County Louth